Mary Ann Sims (born August 28, 1960), known professionally as Dinah Cancer, is an American singer. She is the lead vocalist of 45 Grave, which helped found the deathrock music genre.

Biography 
Cancer's first band was Castration Squad, an all-female punk band formed by Alice Bag of Bags. While a member of this band, Cancer used the moniker "Mary Bat-Thing".

In 1979, 45 Grave was formed. The band also featured guitarist Paul Cutler (formerly of the Consumers), bassist Rob Graves (previously of Bags), drummer Don Bolles (previously of Germs and Nervous Gender) and keyboardist Paul Roessler (previously of the Screamers and Nervous Gender). In 1981, 45 Grave released their first single, "Black Cross", and contributed several songs to the compilation Hell Comes to Your House.

Cancer was also a member of the 45 Grave-related band Vox Pop, and sang backup for Nervous Gender.

Cancer dated Nikki Sixx of Mötley Crüe for a period in the early 1980s, before marrying Cutler while both were members of 45 Grave. The band broke up in 1985, the same year that their song "Partytime" was featured on the soundtrack to the film Return of the Living Dead. They reformed in 1988 and released the live album Only the Good Die Young in 1989. The band came to a permanent halt with the 1990 death of Graves from a heroin overdose.

Cancer remarried briefly and had two daughters named Ilse and Eirika before separating from her second husband. She returned to using her birth name, Mary Sims, becoming a preschool teacher and running the Ragnarok occult bookstore. In 1997, she formed the band Penis Flytrap, who released the mini album Tales of Terror  (1998, Bloody Daggre Records) and the album Dismemberment (2001, Black Plague Records). Cancer and drummer Hal Satan left Penis Flytrap to form Dinah Cancer and the Grave Robbers.

In 2004, 45 Grave reformed for their 25th anniversary, with Cancer as the only original member. Cancer said via her MySpace page: "I'm building this to keep the spirit of 45 Grave alive, introduce its magic to new fans, and as a personal commemorative of my best memories being the driving force and front person of 45 Grave". The reformed 45 Grave (featuring Rikk Agnew and later Frank Agnew) performed the title track to the 2009 horror film Night of the Demons, and released their second studio album, Pick Your Poison, in 2012 on Frontier Records.

References 

1960 births
Living people
American women singers
American punk rock singers
Singers from California
Death rock musicians
Women punk rock singers
Gothic rock musicians
Horror punk musicians
21st-century American women